William Calderwood may refer to:
 William Calderwood, Lord Polton, Scottish lord of session
 William Leadbetter Calderwood, Scottish marine biologist